Ceratosolen solmsi is a species of fig wasps in the family Agaonidae. It has Ficus hispida as its host, where it is parasitized by the other fig wasp Apocrypta bakeri. Wasp larvae develop and hatch into mature wasps entirely within the body of the fig. Female wasps that develop in the center rather than the periphery of the fig have more mating opportunities, produce more offspring, and produce more female relative to male offspring.

References 

 Responses of the pollinating wasp Ceratosolen solmsi marchali to odor variation between two floral stages of Ficus hispida. Chen C and Song Q, J Chem Ecol., 2008 Dec, 34(12), pages 1536–44, 
 Biology and behaviour of Apocrypta bakeri Joseph (Torymidae), cleptoparasite of Ceratosolen marchali Mayr (Agaonidae). Abdurahiman U.C. and Joseph K.J., 1978
Jia, L-Y., Xiao, J-H., Niu, L-M., Ma, G-C., Fu, Y-G., Dunn, D.W., & Huang, D-W. (2014). Delimitation and description of the immature stages of a pollinating fig wasp, Ceratosolen solmsi marchali Mayr (Hymenoptera: Agonidae). Bulletin of Entomological Research, 104(2), 164–175.
Peng, Y-G., Zhang, Y., Compton, S.G., & Yang, D-R.(2014). Fig wasps from the centre of figs have more chances to mate, more offspring and more female-biased offspring sex ratios. Animal Behaviour , 98, 19–25. doi: 10.1016/j.anbehav.2014.09.017

External links 

 

Agaonidae
Insects described in 1885